Baku Slavic University (BSU) is a public university located in Baku, Azerbaijan.

At the university, specializing in the study of Slavic and German languages, diplomats, philologists-teachers, translators of Russian, Polish, Czech, English, German, Bulgarian, Greek, Ukrainian, Belarusian, French, Serbian, Croatian, Slovak, Turkish, as well as specialists in international relations, diplomacy, linguistics, culture, geography, history, law, economics of these countries are trained.                            
Baku Slavic University cooperates with universities and institutions of Eastern and Central European states and has concluded student exchange agreements with universities of Russian Federation, Poland, Ukraine, the Czech Republic, Germany, Greece, Bulgaria, France, Slovakia, Serbia, Belarus, Croatia, Slovenia, United Kingdom, Turkey, Romania, Moldova, North Macedonia, all Central Asia countries (Kazakhstan, Kyrgyzstan, Tajikistan, Uzbekistan), the Baltic states (Latvia, Lithuania, Estonia).

The Baku Slavic University is a member of the International Personnel Academy, the Association of European Universities (Magna Charta Universitatum), the Association of Universities of the Black Sea Basin, the International Association of Teachers of Russian Language and Literature (MAPRYAL).

History 
1946 the Council of People's Commissars of the USSR in the Order No. 1313 dated February 2 and May 15, the decision of the Council of Ministers of the Azerbaijan Soviet Socialist Republic on the basis of a two-year Akhundov Azerbaijan State Institute of Teachers has been established. Associate professor ASLoginov was appointed head of the institute. The first academic year, 108 people were accepted to the institute. There were 28 employees of the institute.

30 July1948 in the profession of a teacher of Russian language and literature in secondary schools of Azerbaijan holds first graduation of the specialists was held.

1952 in the preparation of teachers of Russian language Akhundov Teachers' Institute was transformed into the Pedagogical Institute of the four-year academic term. The largest educational and scientific center of the rusistika later became a center of higher education – the preparation of teachers of Russian language and literature for secondary schools, specialized high schools, was created.

1952 300 people were in the plan. 1952–1953 of the academic year, 40 teachers working at the institute, of which 12 people with a master's degree, associate professor, 3 of them in science class teacher, head teacher, not the degree of 10 people, 15 people were teachers.

1956–1957 in the academic year, the institute was held at five-year education system. The initial phase of its rich history (1952–1959) Akhundov Pedagogical Institute of Russian Language and Literature of the Russian language and literature teachers for secondary schools developed into the largest specialized institution. During this period, the institute developed a teacher of Russian language and literature up to 4000.

14 April 1959 in the Central Committee of the Communist Party of Azerbaijan and the Azerbaijan SSR Council of Ministers "of the Azerbaijan Soviet Socialist Republic on development of higher pedagogical schools," the decision was adopted. According to an official document of the MF and the Azerbaijan Pedagogical Institute of Russian Language and Literature databases on the basis of the Azerbaijan Pedagogical Institute of Foreign Languages named after MF Azerbaijan Pedagogical Institute of Languages was created.

1959 in the composition of APDI Akhundov 15 departments with 188 professors and teachers were operating. During this period, 3700 students studied at the institute. 1966–1967 in the academic year, departments were reorganized, new faculties were created. Faculty of Russian language and literature in two directions – the direction of the Russian language and language functioning in Azerbaijan, was established here in the department of Spanish.

1972 In the first secretary of the Central Committee of the Communist Party of Azerbaijan Heydar Aliyev and the government's initiative of 2 November 1972 on the basis of the decision No. 362 dated the Azerbaijan Pedagogical University named after MF Languages of Azerbaijan Pedagogical Institute of Russian Language and Literature Institute of the base of the same name was restored. All the training and education and scientific research institute of the department implemented 18. At that time, the education center, 280 teachers, including 6 doctors, professors and 84 candidates of sciences, senior lecturer working.

1974 in two of the faculty at the institute - # 1 for students graduating from secondary school in the Russian language, Russian language and literature, for students graduating from the Azeri language in # 2, a decision was made on the establishment of Russian language and literature departments. Scientific-research and educational institute meets goals and objectives, purposeful character and Azerbaijan National Academy of Sciences of the Coordination Council of the plan was carried out. During the period of operation of the teaching staff of the institute, the All-Union and international scale scientific-methodical conferences, seminars, and symposium probably took an active part.

Modern history 
1994 in accordance with international standards of the new four-year curriculum for undergraduate training has taken place.

President of the Republic of Azerbaijan, Heydar Aliyev, 13 June 2000 in the MF in the decree on the basis of the Azerbaijan Pedagogical Institute of Russian Language and Literature is a unique educational institution in its own direction and the entire eastern region known as the rare specialties training of professional staff in carrying out the high school – was established in Baku Slavic University.

Well-known scholar, doctor of philological sciences, professor, honored scientist Nurlana Aliyev by the decree of the President of the republic, was appointed the rector of BSU. Developed and implemented a broad program of reforms under his leadership, the university's teaching, education, material-technical base of the completely updated, BSU has become one of the most advanced educational institutions.

With the countries of the world community of independent Azerbaijan, as well as constantly expanding relations with Eastern European states of these countries is not only the language and literature, as well as economy, geography, socio-political system and culture that are deeply conditioned the need for the preparation of highly qualified personnel. The purpose of this task with a high level of implementation of the re-organization of the necessity of having high school emerged. In fact, higher status and ability of students to new educational center providing a wide ixtisaslasmasını created.

BSU in a short period of time, highly qualified, professional staff, educational and scientific potential, with modern infrastructure has become a comprehensive educational institution. This is a unique educational and cultural center of Baku Slavic University as the Slavic peoples of the region and promotes the study of moral values. The Russian, Slavic languages and literature is carried out serious research, not only for our republic, but also highly qualified human resources for a number of Eastern countries. Structural changes which have occurred in the university covers all of its areas of activity.

Quarry in the regular education during the last two years BSU has become a center of scientific slavistika and Slavic culture. Today at Baku Slavic University has 26 departments. University professors and teaching staff of 38 doctors, professors, 184 candidates of sciences, senior lecturer and senior lecturer and teacher, includes more than 200.

Faculties 
There are 5 faculties and 2 departments.
Faculty of Pedagogy.
Bachelor in Russian literature and language with a focus of choice from:
 Elementary teaching.
 Primary school educators.
 Social work and social pedagogics.
 Preschool education and training.
Faculty of Linguistics and foreign language teaching.
Bachelor in Linguistics (Russian/English/French/German language and literature) and Foreign language teaching (Russian/English/French/German). The chair of the faculty includes 7 departments.
Faculty of Translation. 
Bachelor in translation for the English, Greek, Russian, Bulgarian, Ukrainian, Polish and Czech languages.
Faculty of International relations and regional studies. 
Bachelor in International studies and politics with a focus on East (Russia, Ukraine, Poland) and Central Europe (Czech Republic), Balkan (Bulgaria), Greece and Turkey.
Faculty for Azerbaijan linguistics and journalism.

Departments:
Master's department.
Dean's office for International Students.

Base and opportunities Education 
BSU in the "Dictionary Center", "Turkish-Slavic Relations", "Translation Problems", "International Relations" scientific-research laboratories, "The problems of Azerbaijan" was established in scientific and educational center.

Bachelor's and Master's training of highly qualified university faculty and departments to implement, as well as the general and educational leksikoqrafiyasının, psixolinqvistika and bilinqvizmin, Turkic-Slavic literary and moral relations, scientific-research laboratory, who studied azərbaycansunaslıgın actual problems, the Foreign Relations Department, teaching general education and humanitarian programs lyceum, Ukraine, Sunday school, a publishing-printing center, student theater, "Mr. hours" club, Correspondence Department of Education, Master's office, post-graduate and doctoral work.

University "of scientific works of BSU", "the Russian language and literature" scientific methodical journal, scientists and teachers, graduate students and magistrantların məcmuələri scientific articles are published, "Student World" newspaper is published.

2002, since the candidate and doctoral dissertation research at BSU Council on the protection of the specialized functions. BSU for university students in the new textbooks and teaching resources that meet the requirements of science and culture, vocabulary and literature, educational programs and special attention is paid to the development of methodical recommendations.

Development of new educational programs in all specialties, the history of Russian literature, literary theory, practical Russian language, pedagogy, Russian linguistics and other fields of science textbooks for high school students, teaching aids have been prepared for print publication, as well as the dordcildli "Azerbaijan-Russian Dictionary" see the best examples in the book.

Honorary degrees 

2000 in the Baku Slavic University, "honorary doctor" s name has been established. The strengthening of friendship and cooperation between the countries and peoples, science, education and culture in the work performed great services for the development of a number of prominent state and public and political figure in the decision of the Scientific Council of BSU was awarded the honorary title. Today, the President of the Russian Federation Vladimir Putin, Patriarch of Moscow and All Russia II Aleksiy, the Ukrainian Rada Speaker VPlyusc, chairman of the Federation Council of Russia Sergei Mironov, the Presidents of Bulgaria Jelyu Zhelev (1990–1997) and Georqi Parvanov, the president of Greece KStefanopulos, Ukrainian President Viktor Yushchenko and the Polish President Lech Kaczynski Honorary Doctors of Baku Slavic University .

International relations 
BSU multilateral relations with many foreign countries has established high schools. The University External Relations Russia, France, Ukraine, Bulgaria, Czech Republic, Poland, Greece and other countries, the prestigious higher educational institutions, signed contracts and agreements shall be governed by the scientific and public organizations. Named after AS Pushkin State Russian Language Institute of Baku Slavic University (Moscow, Russia), regional Academy of Personnel Management (Ukraine, Kyiv), Slavic University (Ukraine, Kyiv), "Ovidius" University (Greece, constant), University of Shumen (Bulgaria, Shumen ), named after BXmelnitski Cerkask State University (Ukraine, Cerkassk), Moscow State International Relations Institute (Moscow, Russia), Institute of INALKO Eastern languages and cultures (France, Paris) has signed contracts with.

Representatives of foreign states, public and political circles, well-known science, education and culture are closely cooperating with the university staff. During the last two years, a number of public figures, politicians and scientists – the chairman of the Russian Federal Council SMMironov, the speaker of the Russian Duma QNSeleznyov, first vice-mayor of Moscow LSvetsova, Minister of Education of the Russian Federation VFilippov, writer and critic, LYLavrova, French "INALKO" KAliber vice-president of the University of Oriental languages, the President of the Republic of Bulgaria (1990–1997) JJelev, senior dean of the faculty of the University of Shumen EDobreva, a number of foreign countries, representatives of press agencies, and prominent cultural figures have been the guest of the university. University students and magistrantlarının Russia, Ukraine, Bulgaria, Poland and other well-known high schools in foreign countries to be involved in the practice of scientific research, professional education courses, this was the case in traditional educational institutions and teacher-student exchange.

Recently, a number of Baku Slavic University was an important republican scientific-practical conferences.

2002–2003 BSU in the Ministry of Education and the Russian Federation Embassy of the republican scientific-practical conference with the actual problems of teaching Russian language and literature in secondary schools have been removed from the agenda, the ways to solve these problems are investigated and the resolution was adopted.

Educational-Cultural Center of the University of Ukraine, Russia, Educational and Cultural Center ("the Moscow audience"), Turkish Studies Center, Center for Modern Greek language and mədniyyəti, Bulgarian and Polish language and culture center of the active center and mədniyyəti function.

The university is a member of the Caucasus University Association.

Library 
The library has been established at the university since its foundation, 1946. Most changes at university affected the structure of the library as well as its operation. The President of the Republic of Azerbaijan, Ilham Aliyev signed a decree for the restoration of Baku Slavic University in 2008. The major part of the funding was spent on the removal of library to the new area.

Student life 
BSU has been repaired at a higher level assembly hall, conference hall, library and sports hall used by the students. Students from various amateur associations, scientific organizations, SHK-or, were involved in the sports sections. Athletes, students, especially volleyball, handball and basketball teams are among the winners of the Spartakiadası and Universiadasının. Ozunuidarəsinin model student groups have been created.

Students are involved in university management, are interested in the proposals. In this regard, at the initiative of the rector of the "One-day caliph" particularly important and memorable event. On 13 December every year since 2002 the rector, prorektorlar, deans and department responsibilities mudirlərinin magistrantlar of students and university life, and thus canlandırmıslar new ideas. Student self-government as a result of the day, students and students with the proposal of the Parliament of magistrantların more actively involved in the creation and university students it was decided to self-government bodies.

Translation and Information centers of the university take an active part in the work of the Student Scientific Society and raise money for charity projects.

Sport in Baku Slavic University 
The students of the Baku Slavic University are engaged in the sport sections on football, basketball, volleyball, handball, tennis, badminton, field athletics, chess and others. They actively participate in the Republic and the International competitions demonstrating excellent results. The students of the university have been honoured with cups, trophies and medals in recognition of their sport skills.

BSU students’ teams on football, basketball and volleyball took active part and have won cups and medals in Commonwealth Games among the pedagogical Universities of the CIS countries held in Moscow, Kyiv and Minsk.

Museum 
The university museum was established in 2000. The museum is equipped with modern technical facilities. Besides, the handworks of students such as paintings, waving artworks and other works are presented in museum. There is also a board of martyrs who died for their homeland.

Notable alumni 

 Eldar Gasimov – Azerbaijani Singer, winner of Eurovision Song Contest 2011. Human of year in Azerbaijan (2011)
 Telman Jafarov – PhD, vice-rector on educational issues of Baku Slavic University
 Vali Khidirov – linguist, specialist on Caucasian studies
 Kheyrulla Aghayev- researcher, writer. Editor-in-Chief of "Oil Rocks" newspaper
 Amina Yusifgizi – actress, People's Artist of Azerbaijan (1998)

References

External links 

 Baku Slavic University

 
Educational institutions established in 1946
1946 establishments in the Soviet Union